The Pavana River is a notable river crossing the city of Pune, India.

Geology
Flowing eastwards initially, it becomes southbound and passes through the suburbs of Ravet, Thergaon, Chinchwad, Pimpri and Dapodi before its confluence with the Mula river near Sangvi.

An earthfill gravity dam forms the Pavana reservoir.

Environmental Degradation
The river is reported to be severely polluted, causing the civic activists to blame the governing body for not taking appropriate steps to limit the degradation. Accumulation of silt and discharge of untreated industrial waste are the major factors of pollution of the river, and has made the river water unfit for any activity.

Stealing of water 
In 2018 Bombay High court slammed Maharashtra government for permitting Maharashtra Cricket Association (MCA) to use this river's water for maintenance of Maharashtra Cricket Association Stadium of Gahunje near Pune in the name of use for industrial purpose. In the hearing of Public Interest Litigation (PIL) of a NGO Loksatta movement. MCA was using this river's water from past six years in disguise of Industrial purpose. Bombay High court said, it is clear that MCA is not running any industry and using Pavana river's water for Pune stadium under industrial category is totally illegal.

References

Rivers of Maharashtra
Geography of Pune district
Rivers of India